A Farley file is a set of records kept by politicians on people whom they have met.

The term is named for James Farley, Franklin Roosevelt's campaign manager. Farley, who went on to become Postmaster General and chairman of the Democratic National Committee, kept a file on everyone he or Roosevelt met.

Whenever people were scheduled to meet again with Roosevelt, Farley would review their files. That allowed Roosevelt to meet them again while knowing their spouse, their children's names and ages, and anything else that had come out of earlier meetings or any other intelligence that Farley had added to the file. The effect was powerful and intimate.

Farley files are now commonly kept by other politicians and businesspeople.

A predecessor may be Ancient Rome's nomenclator, "a slave who attended his master during canvassing and on similar occasions, for the purpose of telling him the names of those he met in the street."

In fiction
The concept figures prominently in Robert A. Heinlein's novel Double Star in which an actor impersonates a major politician. He is able to extend the impersonation into personal encounters by use of the politician's Farley file.

The name also appears in Michael Crichton's novel Rising Sun in which Ellen Farley helps the mayor: "She stands by his side and whispers everybody's name to him."

See also
 Customer relationship management
 Individual resource management
 Vizier

References

Political terminology of the United States